Suvojit Banerjee (born 21 March 1985) is an Indian former cricketer. He played three first-class matches for Bengal in 2014.

See also
 List of Bengal cricketers

References

External links
 

1985 births
Living people
Indian cricketers
Bengal cricketers
Cricketers from Kolkata